Amosulalol (INN) is an antihypertensive drug. It has much higher affinity for α1-adrenergic receptors than for β-adrenergic receptors. It is not approved for use in the United States.

References

2-Phenoxyethanamines
Alpha-1 blockers
Beta blockers
Catechol ethers
O-methylated phenols
Phenylethanolamines
Sulfonamides